A Warning (Výstraha) is a 1953 Czechoslovak drama film, directed by Miroslav Cikán. It stars Jiří Dohnal, Josef Mixa, and Vladimír Petruška.

References

External links
A Warning (Výstraha) at the Internet Movie Database

1953 films
Czechoslovak drama films
1953 drama films
Films directed by Miroslav Cikán
1950s Czech films